I.C. Kill is a 1999 Hong Kong horror film directed by Mihiel Wong and starring Michael Tse and Liz Kong. This film features realistic presentations of the internet.

Plot
Jim (Michael Tse) and Roy are friends living together. Jim has recently broken up with his girlfriend and decides to meet new girls through a social networking website ICQ. There, he meets a girl Hiroko (Liz Kong) and they become friends.

Both Jim and Roy find Hiroko attractive and Roy plans to have a one-night stand with her. He uses Jim's ICQ account and asks Hiroko out where then they meet in Ma Liu Shui. However, Roy never comes back from his meeting with Hiroko and is later found dead.

This case is handled by Inspector Lau. Hiroko is the prime suspect but there is no evidence. Lau begins to track down old files and ends up finding something very shocking.

Cast
Michael Tse as Jim Cheung
Liz Kong as Hiroko
Jason Chu as Roy Lung
Wan Yeung-ming as Inspector Lau
Kenny Lam as Dee
Chan Wing-leung

External links

I.C. Kill at Hong Kong Cinemagic

1999 films
Hong Kong supernatural horror films
1999 horror films
Hong Kong ghost films
1990s Cantonese-language films
Films set in Hong Kong
Films shot in Hong Kong
1990s Hong Kong films